Tuasa is a village in the Upper West Region of Ghana.

Famous sons
Henry Seidu Daanaa - Ghana's first trained blind lawyer and Minister for Chieftaincy and Traditional Affairs.

References

Upper West Region